is a Japanese football player for J-Lease FC from 2023.

Career
On 6 January 2022, Tegevajaro Miyazaki confirmed Sonoda as a new signing for the J3 season, coming from Kagoshima United FC.

On 29 December of the same year, Sonoda was officially transferred to J-Lease FC to play on the Kyushu Soccer League for the upcoming 2023 season.

Club statistics
Updated to the end 2022 season.

References

External links

Profile at Tokushima Vortis
Profile at Azul Claro Numazu

1993 births
Living people
Fukuoka University alumni
Association football people from Kagoshima Prefecture
Japanese footballers
J2 League players
J3 League players
Japan Football League players
Azul Claro Numazu players
Tokushima Vortis players
Kagoshima United FC players
Tegevajaro Miyazaki players
J-Lease FC players
Association football forwards